Daran Rural District is in the Central District of Jolfa County, East Azerbaijan province, Iran. At the National Census of 2006, its population was 1,566 in 556 households. There were 1,533 inhabitants in 620 households at the following census of 2011. At the most recent census of 2016, the population of the rural district was 1,571 in 670 households. The largest of its seven villages was Daran, with 900 people.

References 

Jolfa County

Rural Districts of East Azerbaijan Province

Populated places in East Azerbaijan Province

Populated places in Jolfa County